Methylmalonic acid (MMA) (conjugate base methylmalonate) is a dicarboxylic acid that is a C-methylated derivative of malonate.

The coenzyme A linked form of methylmalonic acid, methylmalonyl-CoA, is converted into succinyl-CoA by methylmalonyl-CoA mutase, in a reaction that requires vitamin B12 as a cofactor. In this way, it enters the Krebs cycle, and is thus part of one of the anaplerotic reactions.

Pathology
Increased methylmalonic acid levels may indicate a vitamin B12 deficiency. However, it is sensitive (those with the deficiency almost always test positive) but not specific (those that do not have vitamin B12 deficiency may have elevated levels of methylmalonic acid detected). MMA is elevated in 90–98% of patients with B12 deficiency. It has lower specificity as 20–25% of patients over the age of 70 have elevated levels of MMA, but 25–33% of them do not have B12 deficiency. For this reason, MMA test is not routinely recommended in the elderly. Moreover, MMA accumulation in the blood with age has been linked with tumour progression in 2020 .

Bacterial overgrowth in the small intestine can also lead to elevated levels of methylmalonic acid due to the competition of bacteria in the absorption process of vitamin B12. This is true of vitamin B12 from food and oral supplementation and can be circumvented by vitamin B12 injections. It is also hypothesized from case studies of patients with short bowel syndrome that intestinal bacterial overgrowth leads to increased production of propionate, which is a precursor to methylmalonic acid. It has been shown that in these cases, methylmalonic acid levels returned to normal with the administration of metronidazole.

An excess is associated with methylmalonic acidemia.

If elevated methylmalonic acid levels are accompanied by elevated malonic acid levels, this may indicate the metabolic disease combined malonic and methylmalonic aciduria (CMAMMA). By calculating the malonic acid to methylmalonic acid ratio in plasma, CMAMMA can be distinguished from classic methylmalonic acidemia.

MMA concentrations in blood are measured by gas chromatographic mass spectrometry or LC-MS and the expected values of MMA in healthy people are between 73 and 271 nmol/L.

See also
 Malonic acid

References

Further reading
 Vitamin B12, cognition, and brain MRI measures: a cross-sectional examination.

Dicarboxylic acids